The Hellsgate Wilderness is a  protected wilderness within the Tonto National Forest in Gila County, Arizona, at the base of the Mogollon Rim. It was created by the U.S. Congress in 1984 and is managed by the U.S. Forest Service.

Topography
The Hellsgate Wilderness is on the edge of the Mogollon Rim. Tonto Creek is a perennial creek that cuts a  canyon through the wilderness. The terrain is subject to steep elevation changes throughout the entire wilderness area.

Wildlife
Due to available water, the Hellsgate Wilderness is home to myriad animal life, including black bears, mountain lions, mule deer, coyotes, gray foxes, javelinas, and, beavers. Trout, catfish, and smallmouth bass live in the perennial creeks.

History
The southern part of the Hellsgate Wilderness was home to the native American group known as the Salado. This civilization flourished along the banks of the Salt River in the 13th and 14th centuries. In the later part of the 14th century, the Salado went into decline and by 1400 the Hellgate Wilderness area was largely abandoned. Sometime in the 16th century, the Apache began using this area for a hunting ground and continued to do so until they were driven out by ranchers and miners of European descent.

In 1927, a Ryan Brougham airplane flown by Martin Jensen, carrying MGM's Leo the Lion, was forced to make an emergency landing in a box canyon in the Hellsgate Wilderness. Both pilot and lion survived with no injuries, and the canyon was named Leo Canyon after the incident. The wreckage of the plane was left in the canyon until 1991, when historic-airplane enthusiast Scott Gifford found it and removed it from the canyon via helicopter. He plans to restore the plane to airworthiness.

Recreation
The Hellgsate Wilderness contains many trails for hiking as well as camping spots. However, usage of this area is light as trailheads are difficult to reach without 4-wheel-drive capability, and most trails are rated as challenging.

During the summer months, the wilderness's perennial creeks attract a small number of anglers.

References

Further reading
 Hiking Arizona: A Guide to Arizona's Greatest Hiking Adventures – Bruce Gibbs – Google Books
 Guide to Arizona's Wilderness Areas – Tom Dollar – Google Books
 Flyfisher's Guide to Arizona – Will Jordan  Google Books
 Exploring Arizona's Wild Areas: A Guide for Hikers, Backpackers, Climbers ... – Scott S. Warren – Google Books

 
Mogollon Rim
National Forests of Arizona
Protected areas established in 1984
1984 establishments in Arizona